David or Dave Davis may refer to:

Arts and entertainment
David Montague Davis (1853–1932), British choirmaster
David Davis (broadcaster) (1908–1996), British radio executive and broadcaster, head of the BBC's Children's Hour
David Stratton Davis (1917–2000), English architect
David Davis (TV producer) (1937–2022), American television producer
David Davis (bluegrass) (born 1961), American mandolinist and singer
JD Davis (a.k.a. Dave Davis, born 1973), Belgian musician
Dave Davis (actor) (born 1989), American actor 
Dave Davis (musician), American trombonist for Sun Ra Arkestra

Politics and law

U.S.
David Davis (Supreme Court justice) (1815–1886), American Supreme Court justice and U.S. Senator
David Floyd Davis (1867–1951), American oil businessman and politician
David J. Davis (1870–1942), American politician, lieutenant governor of Pennsylvania
D. W. Davis (David William Davis, 1873–1959), American politician, Governor of Idaho
David Jackson Davis (1878–1938), U.S. federal judge
David Davis IV (1906–1978), American lawyer and politician
David Davis (Tennessee politician) (born 1959), American politician, U.S. Representative from Tennessee

Other countries
David Davis (New South Wales politician) (1854–1927), Australian politician, member of the New South Wales Legislative Assembly
David Davis (lord mayor of Birmingham) (1859–1938), British politician, first Jewish lord mayor of Birmingham, England
David Davis (British politician) (born 1948), British Member of Parliament, Secretary of State for Exiting the European Union
David Davis (Australian politician) (born 1962), Australian politician, member of the Victorian Legislative Council

Sports
David Davis (cricketer) (1902–1995), New Zealand cricketer and judge
Dave Davis (athlete) (born 1937), United States national shot-put champion
Dave Davis (bowler) (born 1942), American tenpin bowler
Dave Davis (American football) (born 1948), American football player
David Davis (handballer) (born 1976), Spanish handball player
David Davis (footballer) (born 1991), English association football player

Others
David Davis (Castellhywel) (1745–1827), Welsh minister and poet
David Daniel Davis (1777–1841), British physician
David Davis, Blaengwawr, (1797–1866) Australian industrialist, leading figure in the South Wales coal industry
David Davis, Maesyffynnon (coal owner) (1821–1884), Australian industrialist, son of David Davis, Blaengwawr
David E. Davis (ecologist) (1913–1994), American ecologist and animal behaviorist
David Brion Davis (1927–2019), American historian of slavery and abolitionism
David E. Davis (1930–2011), American automotive journalist
Albert Johnson Walker (a.k.a. David W. Davis, born 1946), Canadian murderer

Other uses
David Davis Mansion, historic home in Bloomington, Illinois, U.S.

See also
David Davies (disambiguation)
David Davis Walker (1840–1918), American merchant, a first cousin of Justice Davis

ja:デイヴィッド・デイヴィス